"The Bird Who Knew Too Much" is the fifth episode of the fifth series of the 1960s cult British spy-fi television series The Avengers, starring Patrick Macnee and Diana Rigg, and guest starring Ron Moody, Ilona Rodgers, Kenneth Cope, and Michael Coles. It was first broadcast in the Southern and Tyne Tees regions of the ITV network on Wednesday 8 February 1967. ABC Weekend Television, who commissioned the show for ITV, broadcast it in its own regions three days later on Saturday 11 February. The episode was directed by Roy Rossotti, and written by Brian Clemens.

Plot
When fellow counter-espionage agents are murdered checking out a plot to sell secrets of a missile base to foreign powers, Steed and Emma have to find if birds are being used in the scheme especially under the leadership of Captain Crusoe.

Cast
Patrick Macnee as John Steed
Diana Rigg as Emma Peel
Ron Moody as Jordan
Ilona Rodgers as Samantha Slade
Kenneth Cope as Tom Savage
Michael Coles as Verret
John Wood as Twitter
Anthony Valentine as Cunliffe
Clive Colin Bowler as Robin
John Lee as Mark Pearson

References

External links

Episode overview on The Avengers Forever! website

The Avengers (season 5) episodes